Koshi High School may refer to:

 Fukui Prefectural Koshi High School (Japan)
 Niigata Municipal Koshi High School (Japan)